The 2016 Sun Belt Conference football season was the 16th season in which the Sun Belt Conference operated a football league, and was part of the 2016 NCAA Division I FBS football season. The season began on September 1 with Appalachian State facing Tennessee. This was the third season for the Sun Belt since realignment that took effect in 2014, which added the tenth and eleventh members — Idaho and New Mexico State. Both teams were previously independents before joining the conference. The Sun Belt Conference is a "Group of Five" conference under the College Football Playoff format along with the American Athletic Conference, Conference USA, the Mid-American Conference, and the Mountain West Conference.

In this season, the Sun Belt football conference included 11 members: Appalachian State, Arkansas State, Georgia Southern, Georgia State, Idaho, Louisiana–Lafayette, Louisiana–Monroe, New Mexico State, South Alabama, Texas State, and Troy. The conference championship was determined by win–loss record within the conference.

Arkansas State entered the season as defending Sun Belt champions, as they went undefeated in 2015 conference play. The Red Wolves went on to lose to Louisiana Tech in the New Orleans Bowl 28–47.

Preseason

2016 predictions
The 2016 preseason coaches predictions were released on July 21, 2016, with the vote conducted by the head football coaches of each conference school. Appalachian State was picked to win the conference for the first time in school history. After coming second in the conference last year which resulted a trip to the Camellia Bowl, the Mountaineers returned 22 starters on the field for the upcoming season. Arkansas State, which had won at least a share of the conference title in four of the previous five seasons and was returning 13 starters (6 on offense, 7 on defense), was tapped to finish second.

Below are the results of the coaches poll with total points received next to each school and first-place votes in parentheses.

 1. Appalachian State – 114 (5)
 2. Arkansas State – 110 (5)
 3. Georgia Southern – 98 (1)
 4. Georgia State – 73
 5. Louisiana–Lafayette – 70
 6. Troy – 70
 7. South Alabama – 62
 8. Idaho – 48
 9. New Mexico State – 37
 10. Texas State – 30
 11. Louisiana–Monroe – 14

References:

Season
For the first time in the 16-year history of Sun Belt football, a team from the conference was ranked in the top 25 of the AP Poll. In Week 11, the Troy Trojans, with a record of 8-1, received the #25 spot in the AP Poll. The Trojans lost their next game, to Arkansas State, to drop back out of the rankings.

Sun Belt vs other Conferences

Sun Belt vs Power Conference matchups

This is a list of the power conference teams (ACC, Big Ten, Big 12, Pac-12, SEC) Sun Belt played in non-conference play. (Rankings from the AP Poll):

2016 records against non-conference opponents

Regular Season

Postseason

Players of the Year
2016 Sun Belt Player of the Year awards

All-Sun BeltTeam
Coaches All-Conference Selections

Honorable Mention: Appalachian State: Barrett Burns, A. J. Howard, Taylor Lamb, Myquon Stout; Arkansas State: Justice Hansen, Chris Humes, Waylon Roberson, Kendall Sanders; Georgia Southern: Kevin Ellison, Darius Jones, Jr., Ukeme Eligwe, B. J. Johnson III; Georgia State: Shawanye Lawrence, Alonzo McGee, Keith Rucker, Chandon Sullivan; Idaho: Trent Cowan, Kaden Elliss, Tony Lashley, Jordan Rose; Louisiana-Lafayette: Keenan Barnes, Karmichael Dunbar, Eddie Gordon, Tre'maine Lightfoot; Louisiana-Monroe: Justin Backus, David Griffith, Ajalen Holley, Frank Sutton, Jr.; New Mexico State: Kourtland Busby, Greg Hogan, Anthony McMeans, Tyler Rogers; South Alabama Roman Buchanan, Kalen Jackson, Xavier Johnson, Kevin Kutchera; Troy: Ryan Kay, William Lloyd, Kamryn Melton, Baron Poole; Texas State: Aaron Brewer, Bryan London, Gabe Loyd , Jordan Mittie.

Home attendance

Bold – Exceed capacity
†Season High

References